Maytenus boaria (mayten) is an evergreen tree of the family Celastraceae, native from South America, up to ,  diameter, straight trunk. It occurs naturally approximately from 30 to 50ºS: Chile.

Description

Its leaves are small, alternate, elliptical, fine serrate margins, light green color, about 2.5 and 5 cm long. The flowers are small; male flowers are brownish yellow and female are green with purple lines. Its fruit is a yellow bivalve capsule, which contains one or two seeds, and is covered by a red-colored membrane. Its seeds are easy to germinate.

Cultivation and uses

From its seeds oil is obtained in order to elaborate varnish. The hard wood is used in tool handles and as both ornamental in gardens and reforestation of Chile. European bees produce a very delicious honey from its flowers. Its tender leaves are used to feed cattle, In fact, the name boaria means bovine, because cattle enjoy feeding on them. It is easy to plant by seed.

Mayten tree is fully naturalized in New Zealand where it is spreading very rapidly in the Canterbury region, it now classed as an invasive species and illegal to sell or distribute in NZ.

A small number of trees have been planted in gardens of California and private collections in Spain,  and all of them have acclimatized in those lands. It has been planted in the North Pacific Coast of the United States as far north as Seattle, Washington, and Vancouver, British Columbia.

Occurrences

It is slow-growing and drought resistant tree. When growing wild in Argentina, a more continental climate, it is hardier than those in Chile; but provenance source has not been selected from Argentina for cultivation in Europe.

In Argentina it's found also in Córdoba Province (an area with a continental climate and a dry season in winter), growing among Polylepis australis, a tree endemic of the central-pampean mountains of Argentina.

Example occurrences include the forested slopes of Cerro la Campana in the La Campana National Park of central Chile. There it is associated with the endangered Chilean wine palm, Jubaea chilensis as well as a number of threatened understory plants including Adiantum gertrudis.

References
 C. Donoso (2005) Árboles nativos de Chile. Guía de reconocimiento. Edición 4. Marisa Cuneo Ediciones, Valdivia, Chile. 136p.
 Adriana Hoffman (1998) Flora Silvestre de Chile, Zona Central. Edición 4. Fundación Claudio Gay, Santiago. 254 p.
 C. Michael Hogan (2008) Chilean Wine Palm: Jubaea chilensis, GlobalTwitcher.com, ed. N. Stromberg
"Maiten" In "Enciclopedia de la Flora Chilena"

Line notes

External links

 

boaria
Chilean Matorral
Trees of Argentina
Trees of Chile
Ornamental trees
Garden plants of South America
Trees of Mediterranean climate
Trees of mild maritime climate
Drought-tolerant trees